Mueang Yang is a district (amphoe) in the northeastern part of Nakhon Ratchasima province, northeastern Thailand.

History
The area now known as Mueang Yang district has been occupied since prehistoric times, as evidenced by the discovery of ceramics in Ban Mueang Yang and Ban Krabueang Nok. There are also small Khmer prasat in Ban Mueang Yang and Ban Nang O.

The area of Mueang Yang was separated from Chum Phuang district and made a minor district (king amphoe) on 1 April 1995. The people of Mueang Yang District are descendants of the original Khorat people and migrants from the neighbouring provinces of Buriram, Khon Kaen, Maha Sarakham, and Roi Et.

On 15 May 2007, all 81 minor districts were upgraded to full districts. On 24 August the upgrade became official.

Geography
Neighbouring districts are (clockwise from the north): Ban Mai Chaiyaphot, Phutthaisong, and Khu Mueang of Buriram province; Lam Thamenchai, Chum Phuang, and Prathai of Nakhon Ratchasima Province.

The main water source is the Mun river.

Administration
The district is divided into four subdistricts (tambons). There are no municipal (thesaban nakhon) areas in the district.

References

External links
amphoe.com

Mueang Yang